Sara Frece (born 17 February 1984) is a Slovenian racing cyclist. She competed in the 2013 UCI women's time trial in Florence.

References

External links

1984 births
Living people
Slovenian female cyclists
Place of birth missing (living people)